John O'Brien (20 February 1937 – 30 March 1979 (aged 42)) born in Glasgow was a Scottish professional feather/super feather/light/light welterweight boxer of the 1960s and '70s, who won the British Commonwealth featherweight title, and was a challenger for the BBBofC British featherweight title against; Howard Winstone, and Jimmy Revie and European Boxing Union (EBU) featherweight title against Howard Winstone.

References

External links

Image - John O'Brien

1937 births
1979 deaths
Featherweight boxers
Lightweight boxers
Light-welterweight boxers
Place of death missing
Scottish male boxers
Boxers from Glasgow
Super-featherweight boxers